Twelve teams competed in the women's football tournament at the 2016 Summer Olympics. In addition to host nation Brazil, 11 women's national teams qualified from six separate continental confederations.

Table
In addition to host nation Brazil, 11 women's national teams qualified from six separate continental confederations. FIFA ratified the distribution of spots at the Executive Committee meeting in March 2014.

Dates and venues are those of final tournaments (or final round of qualification tournaments), various qualification stages may precede matches at these specific venues.
England finished in the top three among UEFA teams in the World Cup, however England is not an IOC member and talks for them to compete as Great Britain broke down.
Nations making their Olympic tournament debut

AFC

Australia and China PR earned Olympic qualification places by finishing in the top two of the standings of the final round.

First round

Second round

Final round

CAF

South Africa and Zimbabwe earned Olympic qualification places by winning their fourth round ties.

First round

Second round

Third round

Fourth round

CONCACAF

The United States and Canada earned Olympic qualification places by winning their semi-final matches.

Preliminary round

Caribbean Zone

First round

Final round

Central American Zone

Group stage

Knockout stage

CONMEBOL

Colombia earned an Olympic qualification place by finishing second in the Copa América Femenina. Brazil automatically qualified as the Olympic host.

First stage

Final stage

OFC

New Zealand earned an Olympic qualification place by winning their second round tie.

First stage

Group stage

Knockout stage

Second stage

UEFA
Same as the qualification process for previous Olympics, UEFA used the FIFA Women's World Cup to determine which women's national teams from Europe qualify for the Olympic football tournament. The three teams from UEFA that progressed the furthest in the 2015 FIFA Women's World Cup played in Canada, other than ineligible England, would qualify for the 2016 Summer Olympics women's football tournament in Brazil. If teams in contention for the Olympic spots were eliminated in the same round, ties were not broken by their overall tournament record, and play-offs or a mini-tournament to decide the spots would be held provisionally in February/March 2016.

England were ineligible for the Olympics as they were not an Olympic nation, although Great Britain did compete in 2012 as the host nation. The Football Association had originally declared on 2 March 2015 its intention to enter and run teams on behalf of the British Olympic Association at the 2016 Olympics should England qualify. Following strong objections from the Scottish, Welsh and Northern Irish football associations, and a commitment from FIFA that they would not allow entry of a British team unless all four Home Nations agreed, the Football Association announced on 30 March 2015 that they would not seek entry into the Olympic tournament.

After Norway were eliminated by England in the round of 16 on 22 June 2015, it was confirmed that two of the three spots would go to quarter-finalists France and Germany because there could not be more than three eligible European teams in the quarter-finals. Eventually no other eligible European team reached the quarter-finals, so the four European teams eliminated in the round of 16 (Netherlands, Norway, Sweden and Switzerland) would compete in the UEFA play-off tournament to decide the last spot.

Sweden earned UEFA's last Olympic qualification place by winning the qualifying tournament.

FIFA Women's World Cup

Olympic Qualifying Tournament

References

 
Women